The New International Commentary on the Old Testament is a series of commentaries in English on the text of the Old Testament in Hebrew. It is published by the William B. Eerdmans Publishing Company. The series editors are Robert L. Hubbard, Jr. and Bill T. Arnold.

The NICOT covers all 39 books of the Old Testament with the exceptions of Exodus, 1 & 2 Kings, 1 & 2 Chronicles, Esther, and Daniel.

Volumes 

 (to be released November 2022)
 (projected future volume)
 replaced 

 Replaced 

 Replaced 

 Replaced 

 (to be release later in May 2023)
 Replaced 

 Replaced 

 Replaced

Physical Parameters 

Reception 
Christianity Today magazine included the series in a list of the more significant publications and achievements of Evangelicalism in the latter half of the 20th century.

See also 

 New International Commentary on the New Testament
 Book series
 Exegesis
 Textual criticism

Notes 

Old Testament
Biblical commentaries